Pansophic Learning is a for-profit charter management organization with schools in the United States, Switzerland, and the United Kingdom.  Pansophic is based in McLean, Virginia. Its Accel Schools subsidiary is the largest charter school operator in Ohio.

History
Pansophic was founded in 2014 by Ronald J. Packard, who had founded Stride, Inc. in 1999. A 2015 acquisition made Pansophic the largest charter school operator in Ohio, with twelve schools and 3,286 students. It took over White Hat Management's vendor operated school contracts.

In 2014, the company bought the International School of Berne (Switzerland).

The company supplies the curricula for six schools operated by the Aurora Academies Trust in the United Kingdom.

References

Companies based in McLean, Virginia
Education companies of the United States
Education reform
Education management organizations
Charter management organizations
American companies established in 2014
2014 establishments in Virginia